Marc is the surname of:

 Alessandra Marc (born 1957), American operatic soprano
 Andrei Marc (born 1993), Romanian footballer
 Franz Marc (1880-1916), German painter and printmaker
 Jeanny Marc (born 1950), a member of the National Assembly of France representing Guadeloupe
 Philip Marc, High Sheriff of Nottinghamshire, Derbyshire and the Royal Forests in 1208, proposed as the model for the Sheriff of Nottingham in the Robin Hood legends
 Robert Marc (artist) (1943–1993), French artist
 Robert Marc (fencer), French fencer in the 1900 Olympics
 Robert E. Marc, American ophthalmologist

See also
 Mark (surname)

Surnames from given names